TBPO is an extremely toxic bicyclic phosphate convulsant and GABA receptor antagonist.

See also
TBPS
IPTBO

References

Convulsants
Neurotoxins
Bicyclic phosphates
GABAA receptor negative allosteric modulators
Tert-butyl compounds